Stan Eisenhooth (born July 8, 1963) is a former American football center and tackle. He played for the Seattle Seahawks in 1988 and for the Indianapolis Colts in 1989.

References

1963 births
Living people
American football centers
American football tackles
Towson Tigers football players
Seattle Seahawks players
Indianapolis Colts players
National Football League replacement players